Amber is a rural locality in the Shire of Mareeba, Queensland, Australia.

Geography
The Lynd River forms a small part of the southern boundary before flowing through from south to north.

The terrain is undulating and there are a number of mountains in the locality:

 Amber Pinnacle 
 Geaneys Knob 
 Ixe Mountain 
 Mount Emu 
 Mount McDevitt 
 Quartz Blow 
 Round Mountain 
 Webster Peak 
The land use is grazing on native vegetation.

History 

References 

Shire of Mareeba
Localities in Queensland